Pstrina is a village and municipality in Svidník District in the Prešov Region of north-eastern Slovakia.

History
In historical records the village was first mentioned in 1497.

Geography
The municipality lies at an altitude of 325 metres and covers an area of 6.230 km². It has a population of about 59 people.

References

External links
 
http://www.statistics.sk/mosmis/eng/run.html

Villages and municipalities in Svidník District
Šariš